Teodor Lippmaa (17 November 1892 in Riga – 27 January 1943 in Tartu) was a noted Estonian botanist. He was the president of the Estonian Naturalists' Society in 1939–1942.

There is a monument honoring him in Tartu where he lived for much of his life. It was erected in 1982.

Lippmaa is buried at the Rahumäe cemetery in Tallinn. He was the father of Endel Lippmaa, also a well-known scientist.

References

20th-century Estonian botanists
1892 births
1943 deaths
Scientists from Riga
Academic staff of the University of Tartu
Members of the Estonian Academy of Sciences
Recipients of the Protection of Natural Amenities Medal, Rank II
Burials at Rahumäe Cemetery